Derek Pearcy is a game designer, writer, editor and graphic designer  known for his work on role-playing games.

Career
Pearcy served as the editor of Pyramid for its first two print issues, in 1993. He worked for Steve Jackson Games in the 1990s. Pearcy was working as a staff member of Steve Jackson Games when they chose him to develop their own version of the French role-playing game In Nomine. SJG's In Nomine was published in 1997. In Nomine won the Origins Award for Best Graphic Presentation of a Roleplaying Game, Adventure, or Supplement of 1997. He was a special guest at HexaCon 9 in 1999.

References

GURPS writers
Living people
Role-playing game designers
Year of birth missing (living people)